The Flamingo Rising is a 2001 dramatic film in the Hallmark Hall of Fame released on television in 2001, and based on the novel The Flamingo Rising written by Larry Baker in 1997.  The movie stars Christopher Larkin, William Hurt, Elizabeth McGovern, and Brian Benben.  The movie focuses on the feud between a funeral parlor owner and a man who wants to set up a large drive-in theatre across the street from the parlor. Former In the Heat of the Night star Randall Franks returned to CBS, which aired the film, in the cameo role of "Officer Randy Kraft."

External links
 

2001 television films
2001 films
2001 drama films
2000s English-language films
American drama films
Films directed by Martha Coolidge
Films scored by David Newman
Funeral homes in fiction
Hallmark Hall of Fame episodes
2000s American films